This is a list of windmills in the Czech Republic.

References

External links
Czech windmill website (in Czech).

Czech Republic
Lists of buildings and structures in the Czech Republic